was a town located on the southern half of Yakushima (Yaku Island) in Kumage District, Kagoshima Prefecture, Japan.

As of 2003, the town had an estimated population of 7,008 and a population density of 28.96 persons per km². The total area was 242.03 km².

On October 1, 2007, Yaku, along with the town of Kamiyaku (also from Kumage District), was merged to create the town of Yakushima.

External links
 
 
Yakushima Town 

Dissolved municipalities of Kagoshima Prefecture